Mobile Home is a 2012 Belgian comedy-drama film directed by François Pirot. It was written by Pirotand, Marteen Loix and Jean-Benoît Ugeux. It premiered on August 4, 2012, at the Locarno International Film Festival. The film was nominated for seven Magritte Awards, winning Most Promising Actress and Best Original Score.

Cast
Arthur Dupont as Simon
Guillaume Gouix as Julien
Jean-Paul Bonnaire as Luc
Claudine Pelletier as Monique
Jackie Berroyer as Jean-Marie
Anne-Pascale Clairembourg as Sylvie
Eugénie Anselin as Maya
Catherine Salée as Valérie
Arnaud Bronsart as Stéphane
Gwen Berrou as Virginie
Jean-François Wolff as Gérard
Jérôme Varanfrain as Mathieu

References

External links

2012 films
2012 comedy-drama films
Belgian comedy-drama films
Luxembourgian comedy-drama films
French comedy-drama films
2010s French-language films
French-language Belgian films
2010s French films